Pedro is a masculine given name.

Pedro may also refer to:

Places
 Pedro, South Dakota, a ghost town in the United States
 Pedro, Ohio, an unincorporated community in the United States

Entertainment
 Pedro (card game), a card game
 Pedro (film), a 2008 American film about Pedro Zamora
 Pedro (band), a Japanese band active from 2018 to 2021
 Pedro (video game), a 1984 video game
 Pedro (The Mysterious Cities of Gold), a character in the animated series The Mysterious Cities of Gold
 Pedro (One Piece), a character in the Japanese manga One Piece

Other uses
 PEDRO Center, a satellite ground center abbreviated as PEDRO
 Physiotherapy Evidence Database, a physiotherapy database sometimes abbreviated as PEDro
 One of the callsigns for helicopters of the United States Air Force Combat Rescue School and successive services
 Pedro, pen name of Salo Grenning (1918–1986), a Norwegian illustrator
 Pedro (Boy's Life), a fictional burro created as the mascot of the Boy Scouts of America magazine Boy's Life

See also
 San Pedro (disambiguation)
 São Pedro (disambiguation)